Daniel Connor (1831–1898) was an Irish convict transported to Western Australia in the 19th century.

Daniel or Dan Connor may also refer to:

 Dan Connor (American football) (born 1985), 2007 Chuck Bednarik Award winner
 Dan Connor (footballer) (born 1981), Irish football goalkeeper who played for Hereford United

See also
  Dan Conner, a character in the American sitcom Roseanne and its spin-off, The Conners
 Dan Conners (1942–2019), American football player
 Daniel Connors (born 1988), Australian rules footballer who currently plays with the Richmond Football Club
 Daniel O'Connor (disambiguation)